The 2022 EHF European Men's Handball Championship was the 15th edition of the tournament and the second to feature 24 national teams. It was co-hosted in two countries – Hungary and Slovakia – from 13 to 30 January 2022. It was won by Sweden.

Bid process

Bidding timeline
The bidding timeline was as follows:
 1 May 2017: Bidding nations to provide official expression of interest in the hosting of the tournament
 1 July 2017: Bidding manuals sent to all bidding federations
 1 November 2017: Deadline for completed bidding and application documentation to be provided to the EHF office
 15 December 2017: Applications to be approved at the EHF executive committee in Hamburg
 20 June 2018: appointment of host(s) of EHF Euro 2022 at the 14th ordinary EHF Congress in Glasgow, Scotland

Bids
On 4 May 2017 it was announced that the following nations had sent in an official expression of interest:
 Belgium, Spain & France
 Czech Republic, Hungary & Slovakia
 Denmark, Germany & Switzerland
 Macedonia
 Russia & Belarus
 Lithuania

However, when the deadline for submitting the final bids was over, the following applications had been received: 
 Belgium, Spain & France
 Denmark & Switzerland
 Hungary & Slovakia

Host selection
On 20 June at the 14th ordinary EHF Congress held in Glasgow, Hungary and Slovakia were selected to host the competition.

Denmark and Switzerland withdrew their bid shortly before the vote.

Venues
Following is a list of all venues and host cities which were used.

Qualification

The qualification for the final tournament took place between January 2019 and May 2021. The two host teams, Hungary and Slovakia, and the two best placed teams from the previous championship, Spain and Croatia, were automatically qualified, leaving a total of 40 national teams to compete for the remaining 20 places in the final tournament.

The competition consisted of three rounds: two qualification phases and a relegation round. The first qualification phase involved teams that did not participate in the second round of the 2020 qualification tournament. The two best teams advanced to a relegation round, where they were joined by the best European team from the 2019 IHF Emerging Nations Championship and the three worst ranked fourth-placed teams from the second round of the 2020 qualification. The three winners of the two-legged relegation round matches advanced to the second and last qualifying phase, joining the remaining 21 teams that participated in the 2020 championship and the remaining eight teams that were eliminated in the second round of the 2020 qualification. Those 32 teams were divided into eight groups by four teams, with top two teams and four best ranked third-teams qualifying.

Qualified teams

Note: Bold indicates champion for that year. Italic indicates host for that year.

Marketing
The official logo and slogan was unveiled on 25 January 2020 at the EHF Extraordinary Congress In Stockholm. The logo includes the national colours of both host nations – red, green, white and blue, forming the handball and an eye, relates closely to the event's motto "Watch Games, See More", highlighting the many opportunities for fans around the six venues.

Draw
The draw took place in Budapest on 6 May 2021.

Seeding
The seedings were announced on 3 May 2021. The organizing countries had the right to allocate one team to each of the groups they were hosting due to potential spectators' interest. Hungary (assigned to group B) selected Croatia (assigned to group C) and Slovenia (assigned to group A), while Slovakia (assigned to group F) selected Germany (assigned to group D) and the Czech Republic (assigned to group E).

Referees
The referee pairs were selected on 10 September 2021. Two more pairs were selected on 10 January 2022.

Squads

Each team consists of up to 20 players, of whom 16 may be fielded for each match.

Preliminary round
All times are local (UTC).

Group A

Group B

Group C

David Mandić received a blue card in the 47th minute for a punch against the head of Kentin Mahé. He received a one game suspension from the EHF and he missed the next game against Serbia.

Group D

Group E

Group F

Main round
Points and goals gained in the preliminary group against teams that advance will be transferred to the main round.

Group I

Group II

Knockout stage

Bracket

Fifth place game

Semifinals

Third place game

Final

Ranking and statistics

Final ranking
The teams ranked fourth in each group after the completion of the preliminary round matches are ranked 19 to 24, while teams ranked third in each group after the completion of the preliminary round matches are ranked 13 to 18 according to the number of points won in the preliminary round. Places seven and eight are attributed to the two teams ranked fourth in the groups, places nine and ten to the two teams ranked fifth in the groups and places eleven and twelve to the two teams ranked sixth in the group according to the number of points won by the respective teams after completion of the main round matches. Places five and six will be decided by a play-off, and the top four places by knock-out.

Entry stages

Method of qualification

All-Star team
The all-star team and MVP were announced on 30 January 2022.

Statistics

Top goalscorers

Source:

Top goalkeepers

<small>Source:

References

External links

EHF Euro 2022 at eurohandball.com

 
European Men's Handball Championship
Sports competitions in Bratislava
Sport in Košice
Sport in Debrecen
Sport in Szeged
European Championship, Men, 2022
European Championship, Men, 2022
International sports competitions in Budapest
European Men's Handball Championship
2022 in Hungarian sport
2022 in Slovak sport
2020s in Budapest